The Peru national badminton team represents Peru in international badminton team competitions. It is controlled by the Peruvian Sports Federation of Badminton (Spanish: Federation Deportiva Peruana de Badminton). The Peruvian mixed team were champions at the 1993 Pan Am Badminton Championships. This qualified them for the Sudirman Cup. The mixed team would continue to compete in the Sudirman Cup until 2011.

The men's team won the 2010 Pan Am Badminton Championships men's team event and qualified for the Thomas Cup for the first time. The men's team competed in the 2010 Thomas Cup but were eliminated in the group stages. The women's team were runners-up at the 2010 Pan Am Badminton Championships.

Peru also competes in badminton at the Pan American Games. The national team has yet to enter a semifinal in any badminton event at the Pan American Games. The national team won 15 bronze medals in the events. Peru also competes in para-badminton. Carmen Giuliana Póveda Flores won Peru its first para-badminton gold medal at the 2017 BWF Para-Badminton World Championships in the women's singles SS6 category.

Participation in BWF competitions

Thomas Cup

Sudirman Cup

Participation in Pan American Badminton Championships

Men's team

Mixed team

Current squad 
The following players were selected to represent Peru at the 2022 Pan Am Male & Female Badminton Cup.

Men
Remo Blondet
Alejandro Chueca Sanchez
Santiago de la Olivia
José Guevara
Diego Mini
Brian Roque
Diego Subauste Tokumura
Fabrizio Tabini Pinasco
Mariano Velarde Alzamora
Adriano Viale

Women
Shary Andrade
Estefania Canchanya
Inés Castillo
Paula la Torre Regal
Namie Miyahira
Ariana Moromisato
Fernanda Munar
Rafaela Munar
Fernanda Saponara Rivva
Rafaela Silva

References

Badminton
National badminton teams
Badminton in Peru